Tommy Haas was the defending champion, but lost in the semifinals to Byron Black.

Magnus Larsson won the title by defeating Byron Black 6–2, 1–6, 6–3 in the final.

Seeds
All seeds received a bye to the second round.

Draw

Finals

Top half

Section 1

Section 2

Bottom half

Section 3

Section 4

References

External links
 Official results archive (ATP)
 Official results archive (ITF)

2000 ATP Tour
2000 Kroger St. Jude International - Singles